Patrick Fischer (born 1975) is a Swiss ice hockey player.

Patrick Fischer may also refer to:

 Patrick C. Fischer (1935–2011), computer scientist and Unabomber target
 Patrick F. Fischer (born 1957), justice on the Ohio Supreme Court
 Pat Fischer (born 1940), American football player

See also
 Patrick Fischler (born 1969), American actor